|}
{| class="collapsible collapsed" cellpadding="0" cellspacing="0" style="clear:right; float:right; text-align:center; font-weight:bold;" width="280px"
! colspan="3" style="border:1px solid black; background-color: #77DD77;" | Also Ran

The 2006 Epsom Derby was a horse race which took place at Epsom Downs on Saturday 3 June 2006. It was the 227th running of the Derby, and it was won by Sir Percy. The winner was ridden by Martin Dwyer and trained by Marcus Tregoning. The pre-race favourite Visindar finished fifth.

Race details
 Sponsor: Vodafone
 Winner's prize money: £740,695
 Going: Good to Firm
 Number of runners: 18
 Winner's time: 2m 35.23s

Full result

* The distances between the horses are shown in lengths or shorter. shd = short-head; hd = head; PU = pulled up.† Trainers are based in Great Britain unless indicated.

Winner's details
Further details of the winner, Sir Percy:

 Foaled: 27 January 2003 in Great Britain
 Sire: Mark of Esteem; Dam: Percy's Lass (Blakeney)
 Owner: Anthony Pakenham
 Breeder: The Old Suffolk Stud
 Rating in 2006 World Thoroughbred Racehorse Rankings: 121

Form analysis

Two-year-old races
Notable runs by the future Derby participants as two-year-olds in 2005.

 Sir Percy – 1st Vintage Stakes, 1st Dewhurst Stakes
 Dylan Thomas – 2nd Autumn Stakes, 6th Racing Post Trophy
 Best Alibi – 4th Racing Post Trophy
 Mountain – 4th Eyrefield Stakes
 Linda's Lad – 2nd Prix des Chênes, 1st Prix de Condé, 1st Critérium de Saint-Cloud
 Championship Point – 1st Chesham Stakes
 Septimus – 1st Beresford Stakes, 3rd Racing Post Trophy
 Sienna Storm – 7th Silver Tankard Stakes
 Atlantic Waves – 5th Autumn Stakes
 Horatio Nelson – 1st Superlative Stakes, 1st Futurity Stakes, 1st Prix Jean-Luc Lagardère, 2nd Dewhurst Stakes

The road to Epsom
Early-season appearances in 2006 and trial races prior to running in the Derby.

 Sir Percy – 2nd 2,000 Guineas
 Dragon Dancer – 2nd Chester Vase
 Dylan Thomas – 1st Derrinstown Stud Derby Trial
 Visindar – 1st Prix Greffulhe
 Best Alibi – 2nd Dante Stakes
 Mountain – 4th Ballysax Stakes, 2nd Derrinstown Stud Derby Trial
 Linda's Lad – 4th Prix Noailles, 1st Lingfield Derby Trial
 Papal Bull – 1st Chester Vase
 Championship Point – 1st Predominate Stakes
 Septimus – 7th Prix La Force, 1st Dante Stakes
 Before You Go – 1st Blue Riband Trial Stakes, 4th Lingfield Derby Trial
 Sienna Storm – 3rd Blue Riband Trial Stakes, 2nd Predominate Stakes
 Atlantic Waves – 1st Feilden Stakes
 Snoqualmie Boy – 3rd Dante Stakes
 Horatio Nelson – 8th 2,000 Guineas

Subsequent Group 1 wins
Group 1 / Grade I victories after running in the Derby.

 Dylan Thomas – Irish Derby (2006), Irish Champion Stakes (2006, 2007), Prix Ganay (2007), King George VI and Queen Elizabeth Stakes (2007), Prix de l'Arc de Triomphe (2007)
 Sixties Icon – St. Leger (2006)
 Septimus – Irish St. Leger (2008)

Subsequent breeding careers
Leading progeny of participants in the 2006 Epsom Derby.

Sires of Group/Grade One winners
Sir Percy (1st)
 Wake Forest - 1st Man o' War Stakes (2016)
 Sir John Hawkwood - 1st The Metropolitan (2016)
 Flighty Lady - 3rd Prix Marcel Boussac (2019)
 Presenting Percy - 1st RSA Insurance Novices' Chase (2018)
Dylan Thomas (3rd)
 Blazing Speed - 1st Queen Elizabeth II Cup (2015)
 Dylan Mouth - 1st Derby Italiano (2014)
 Pretty Please - dam of Persian King (1st Poule d'Essai des Poulains 2019)
 Peter The Mayo Man - 3rd Dovecote Novices' Hurdle (2017)

Sires of National Hunt horses
Linda's Lad (8th)
 Draconien - 1st Herald Champion Novice Hurdle (2018)
 Tout Est Permis - 1st Kinloch Brae Chase (2018)
 Cash Back - 2nd Arkle Novice Chase (2020)

Other Stallions
Sixties Icon (7th) - Standing in Great Britain but shuttles to Argentina - Sired Argentinian Group 1 winners Crazy Icon and Sixties Song along with useful hurdler BuildmeupbuttercupDragon Dancer (2nd) - Sired jumps winners including Goodbye DancerPapal Bull (10th) - Sired flat and jumps winners including The Jam Man (2nd William Fry Handicap Hurdle 2020)Hala Bek (4th) - Exported to AustraliaVisindar (5th) - Exported to SpainChampionship Point (11th) - Exported to Saudi ArabiaAtlantic Waves (15th) - Sired flat placed horse

References
 
 sportinglife.com

Epsom Derby
 2006
Epsom Derby
Epsom Derby
2000s in Surrey